Maria Angélica Barreda (May 15, 1887 – July 21, 1963) became in 1910 the first woman admitted to practice law in Argentina. She graduated from the National University of La Plata in 1909.

References 

1887 births
1963 deaths
Argentine women lawyers
20th-century Argentine lawyers
National University of La Plata alumni
Place of birth missing